The Silambu Express (20681/20682) is a train that runs between  and  via . Initially it ran up to Manamadurai, later it was extended up to Sengottai. It was the only train in Indian Railways where LHB rakes were replaced by ICF coaches again. According to IR if a train gets new LHB coaches it won't be converted to ICF. But this train was again replaced with ICF coaches after getting new LHB rakes.

History 

The name of the train commemorates the Kannagi or (Kannaki), a legendary Tamil woman who is the main character of the South Indian epic Silapathikaram (100–300 CE) who used the Silambu as the only item for saving her husband. To remember this story, the train was named the "Silambu Express". It is a standard train consisting of commercial coaches. The train operates tri-weekly in each direction and covers a distance of 683 km. Initially, the train was announced between Chennai Egmore and Karaikudi Junction but due to public demand it started its Maiden Run until Manamadurai via Sivagangai Instead of Terminating at Karaikudi Junction. From 04/03/2017 onwards this train was further extended to Sengottai via Aruppukkottai, Virudhunagar Junction, Sivakasi, Tenkasi Junction. The Silambu Express was announced in the Railway Budget 2013 and the service started on 22 June 2013, extended to Sengottai from 5 Mar 2017. From 25 Feb 2019, the frequency of the service was increased from bi-weekly to tri-weekly. From April 15, 2022, Chennai Egmore – Sengottai Silambu Express was converted to Superfast category with new number 20681 MS SCT Silambu Superfast Express and Sengottai - Chennai Egmore Silambu express with new number 20682.

Coach Composition

At present,the train has 17 standard ICF utskrit coaches.

 1 AC First Class Cum AC Two Tier
 1 AC Two Tier
 2 AC Three Tier
 8 Sleeper Class
 3 General Unreserved
 2 Luggage Cum Disabled Coaches.

Till November 2021, it has different coach composition.

 1 AC First Class
 1 AC Two Tier
 2 Three Tier
 8 Sleeper Class
 6 General Unreserved
 2 Luggage Cum Disabled Coach.

When it ran as with LHB coaches only for three trips in 2016, it had different coach composition.

 1 AC First Class
 1 AC Two Tier
 3 AC Three Tier
 9 Sleeper Class
 7 General Unreserved
 2 End On Generator Cars.

But due to replacement of ICF Coaches again it was replaced with new coach composition.

Till October 2017 from its introduction it ran with the following composition,

 1 AC Two Tier
 2 AC Three Tier
 8 Sleeper Class
 6 General Unreserved
 2 Luggage Cum Disabled Coach

See also 
Boat Mail
Pothigai Superfast Express
Rockfort Superfast Express
Mannai Express
Pallavan Superfast Express
Sethu Express
Cholan Express
Uzhavan Express
Vaigai Superfast Express

References

External links

Southern Railways - Official Website
Southern Railway

Transport in Chennai
Named passenger trains of India
Rail transport in Tamil Nadu
Railway services introduced in 2013
Express trains in India